Stop Murder Music is a campaign to oppose Caribbean artists that produce music with lyrics alleged to glorify murder of homosexual men. The campaign was mainly against Jamaican musicians, primarily dancehall and reggae artists such as Buju Banton, Bounty Killer, and the Bobo Ashanti Rastafarians Sizzla and Capleton.

The campaign accuses these artists of promoting violence against LGBT people through the lyrics in their music and attempts to stop this.  Stop Murder Music is jointly run by OutRage!, the Black Gay Men's Advisory Group, and J-Flag. The term was coined by British gay rights activist Peter Tatchell in 1992.

Reggae Compassionate Act

The Reggae Compassionate Act was an agreement signed in 2007 by artists including Beenie Man, Capleton, and Sizzla. It has now been somewhat discredited as some artists have felt it was badly worded, while others have denied signing it. Others (including Elephant Man, T.O.K., Bounty Killa, and Vybz Kartel) have simply refused to sign it.

Local campaigns

Canada
Stop Murder Music (Canada) is an independent branch of the organization in Canada, founded by Akim Adé Larcher, after learning at a local West Indian store about a Canadian Tour by Elephant Man. Larcher, a Canadian/Saint Lucian, brought together over 20 organizations from the African and Caribbean communities in Canada to form the group.
 
Despite not causing any artists to be denied entry visas, the campaign was able to get concert venues cancelled, and also get iTunes to remove some tracks by Buju Banton, Elephant Man and TOK that they deemed contrary to their standards.

United Kingdom
The Green Party of England and Wales and OutRage! campaigned on behalf of the stop murder music campaign, including petitioning the United Kingdom Home Secretary in 2004.

Arguments for and against
Tatchell has called for laws against homophobic music and the Campaign participated in protests outside concerts. The Campaign has especially objected to lyrics which they allege to support violence, including allegedly murder, towards gay men. Dennis Carney, chair of the Black Gay Men's Advisory Group, argued in 2004 that the MOBO Awards had a responsibility to exclude anti-gay artists because, "homophobic lyrics in music normalise hatred towards black gay men."

The UK International Development Minister Gareth Thomas argued in a speech that, "A number of artists [such as Sizzla and Buju Banton] are effectively contributing to the spread of HIV by producing reggae and rap songs actually encouraging discrimination against those who have AIDS and encouraging violence against minority groups such as men who have sex with men...Yes, we believe in free speech, but nobody in a democracy should be able to incite violence against minorities." He cited John King and the Mighty Gabby as examples of musicians who are positive role models against violence and discrimination.<ref>Gareth Thomas. "Speech" , UK/CARICOM Champions For Change Conference.</ref>

 Criticism 
Tatchell and the Stop Murder Music campaign have been criticised by The Black Music Council, a British organisation formed in 2004 in response to the campaign by the president of Blacker Dread Records, Blacker Dread, in order "to protect the rights of the eight artists placed on the OutRage! hit list".

See also
 LGBT rights in Jamaica
 No homo

References

External links
"iTunes Canada pulls anti-gay dancehall songs", Xtra.ca''
Murder Inna Dancehall

Violence against LGBT people
Caribbean music
LGBT in Jamaica
LGBT topics in the African diaspora
Murder
Musical advocacy groups
Anti-homophobia